Miloš Nikolić (born 3 October 1994) is a Serbian professional footballer who plays as a centre-back for Loznica.

Club career

Sloboda Užice
Born in Užice, Nikolić started his career with Drina Zone League side Sloga Bajina Bašta, where he performed as a bonus player between 2012 and 2014. He also played with Sloga Požega in the first half of the 2014–15 season, making 10 appearances in the Serbian League West. In the winter break off-season, Nikolić joined Sloboda Užice, and spent the rest of it as a reserve player. He noted 1 appearance for the club, replacing Nikola Lekić in the 25 fixture match against Proleter Novi Sad.

In summer 2015, Nikolić left the club for a one-year period and moved on loan to Sloga Bajina Bašta. During the 2015–16 season, Nikolić played mostly matches in the Drina Zone League, scoring two goals, against Radnički Stobex and Budućnost Arilje.

Returning from loan in the first team of Sloboda Užice, Nikolić passed complete summer pre-season with the club. As the club started new season with deficit of experienced centre-backs, Nikolić started the 2016–17 Serbian First League competition as the first choice. He scored two goals in the 9th fixture home match against ČSK Čelarevo.

Slutsk
On 12 March 2018, Nikolić officially promoted as a new member of the Belarusian Premier League side Slutsk. Nikolić made his debut for new club in first leg of the quarterfinal cup match against Dynamo Brest on 14 March 2018, when he replaced Ihar Yasinski in 71 minute of the game. He also appeared in second leg, playing a full-time match four days later, on 18 March. Nikolić made his Belarusian Premier League debut in 3–1 defeat against BATE at the Borisov Arena on 28 April 2018. Nikolić scored his first goal for Slutsk in 2–0 away victory over Minsk on 11 May 2018. He also scored in 1–1 draw to Dynamo Brest on 23 May 2018.

Career statistics

References

External links

1994 births
Living people
Sportspeople from Užice
Association football defenders
Serbian footballers
FK Sloboda Užice players
FC Slutsk players
FK Mladost Doboj Kakanj players
FK Sloga Požega players
FK Zlatibor Čajetina players
FK Loznica players
Serbian First League players
Belarusian Premier League players
Uzbekistan Super League players
Premier League of Bosnia and Herzegovina players
Serbian expatriate footballers
Expatriate footballers in Belarus
Serbian expatriate sportspeople in Belarus
Expatriate footballers in Uzbekistan
Serbian expatriate sportspeople in Uzbekistan
Expatriate footballers in Bosnia and Herzegovina
Serbian expatriate sportspeople in Bosnia and Herzegovina